Aloha, Scooby-Doo! is a 2005 American animated adventure film, and the eighth in a series of direct-to-video animated films based on the Scooby-Doo Saturday morning cartoons. It was produced and completed in 2004 by Warner Bros. Animation and released on February 8, 2005, by Warner Bros. Family Entertainment, though it featured a copyright logo for Hanna-Barbera Cartoons at the end. The film aired on Cartoon Network on May 13, 2005.

It is also Ray Bumatai's last performance before his death in October 2005. This film and Scooby-Doo and the Cyber Chase were the first Scooby-Doo films to be re-released on Blu-ray, on April 5, 2011.

Plot
The gang travels to Hawaii on a free trip from a surf-and-beachwear company called "Goha Aloha" thanks to Daphne, who the company wants to design some new swimwear for them. They attend the Big Kahuna of Hanahuna Surfing Contest. Formerly only for natives and locals, the contest has been opened to mainlanders by the mayor. Many locals are angry about this, especially Manu Tuiama, a local surfer, and his best friend, Little Jim. A few days before the contest, the demons of the evil Wiki-Tiki spirit attack the village and kidnap Manu's girlfriend, Snookie. This drives away most of the tourists and surfers, and the locals believe the spirit is angry that the surfing contest is open to anybody, and also that a new residential complex, Coconut Beach Condominiums, is being built on supposedly sacred ground by local real estate agent Ruben Laluna. When the gang meets Jared Moon, a representative from the Goha Aloha-company in Hanahuna, he's selling tiki charms that supposedly ward off demons. The mayor refuses to postpone the contest, even after demons attack again at a feast.

The gang wants to get to the bottom of the mystery, and go to Auntie Mahina, a local shaman who lives deep in the jungle. On the way, Manu is seemingly kidnapped by the Wiki-Tiki. Auntie Mahina tells them the Wiki-Tiki is angry at the mainlanders because the surfing contest is a Hawaiian ritual and the winner must be of Hawaiian descent. She says they need to go to the cave where the monster lives to get rid of it, or Snookie and Manu will be sacrificed in the volcano. She also gives Fred a necklace to keep the monster away. The necklace is filled with an extract from a sacred root called bola gawana, which she claims the ancients used to repel evil spirits. The gang goes to the cave, and get chased by bats and the little demons, until they lose them and find Snookie, who tries to lead them out before getting recaptured by the Wiki-Tiki, who is seemingly unaffected by anything the gang or the necklace throws at the monster.

The gang then find themselves in a snake pit cave, but are able to get out of it because of music by Shaggy and Scooby-Doo. After escaping, the gang does some searching and stumbles upon a cave within the volcano, during which they discover that the volcano is in fact still dormant and that the Wiki-Tiki and its demons are not really ancient spirits. The demons turn out to be remote-controlled robots. After looking at a picture of the Wiki-Tiki when it was out surfing, the gang notices that the supposedly 10,000-year-old spirit is using a Goha Aloha-brand surfboard.

Back at the island, it is only one day until the contest, and the locals are really scared something bad will happen. Little Jim blames the mayor for Snookie's and Manu's disappearances, and says that whatever happens during the contest will be her fault too.

The next day, Daphne enters the contest in hopes of drawing out the Wiki-Tiki, whom they are sure will show up. Sure enough, it comes, scares the surfers and chases Shaggy and Scooby until it gets washed up by a wave. The gang unmasks the Wiki-Tiki as Manu and after Snookie (revealed to be Manu's accomplice) runs over to him, it turns out that the couple were behind the Wiki-Tiki scheme. The gang explains that Manu and Snookie wanted to scare off both locals and tourists so they could buy up all the real estate in the area and then sell it back to the original owners at a huge profit. All the places they bought were put under the name "Pamela Waeawa," Snookie's real name. Velma also reveals that Snookie is an expert in both rocket science and robotics, and created the so-called "demons." The mayor ultimately announces Scooby as the winner of the surfing contest (for the way he and Shaggy were surfing while battling Manu), making him the new Big Kahuna of Hanahuna. Manu is shocked and angry at losing to a dog. He and Snookie are arrested and taken to jail.

Later that night, a big luau is held in celebration of the gang's help at the hotel the gang was staying at. Everyone thanks them for solving the mystery and Ruben Laluna reveals that the real estate Manu and Snookie bought will be returned to the original owners. Jared Moon comes by to tell Daphne that Goha Aloha loved her swimsuit designs and wants to buy them. After Auntie Mahina thanks the gang, the mini-tikis come to the party and advance—but instead of attacking people, they dance. It's revealed that Scooby has the remote control for them and is making them dance. Everyone laughs while Scooby says his catchphrase before saying "Aloha!".

Voice cast
 Frank Welker as Fred Jones, Scooby-Doo, Wiki-Tiki
 Casey Kasem as Shaggy Rogers
 Grey DeLisle as Daphne Blake, Auntie Mahina, Local Woman #2
 Mindy Cohn as Velma Dinkley
 Mario Lopez as Manu Tuiama
 Ray Bumatai as Little Jim
 Teri Garr as Mayor Molly Quinn
 Adam West as Jared Moon
 Tom Kenny as Ruben Laluna
 Dee Bradley Baker as Additional Voices
 Tia Carrere as Snookie

References

External links

 
 

2005 direct-to-video films
2005 films
2005 animated films
2000s American animated films
2000s English-language films
American mystery films
American direct-to-video films
Warner Bros. Animation animated films
Warner Bros. direct-to-video animated films
Films set in Hawaii
Scooby-Doo direct-to-video animated films
American surfing films
American children's animated adventure films
American children's animated mystery films
American children's animated comedy films
2000s children's animated films